Agony is a horizontally scrolling shooter with a surreal fantasy background. It was released by Psygnosis in 1992 for the Amiga. The game was developed by the company Art & Magic, which was originally known as Ordilogic Systems. Agony was the only Amiga game developed under the Art & Magic name, as after Agony was released, Art & Magic started developing arcade games exclusively. Agony features a barn owl flying its way through six worlds filled with monsters. The owl uses various waves of echolocation which the player fires at the enemies.

Plot
According to the manual backstory, the sun-wizard master Acanthopsis discovers the "Cosmic Power" with a toll on his life. Before dying he teaches it to his disciples, Alestes and Mentor. Alestes has been transformed into a barn owl, and has to pass through Mentor's traps and monsters in order to reach the Cosmic Power.

Music
The theme song is by Tim Wright, a classically themed, piano-led instrumental. The title song was adapted without giving him proper credit by the keyboardist of Dimmu Borgir in the song "Sorgens Kammer" for their Stormblåst album. The band did not know about this. Following several months of communication between Wright and Dimmu Borgir, and in a nod to the composer, the band did not include the track on a later re-recording of Stormblåst. The title song is also slightly different from the version that Wright originally submitted to Art & Magic. Franck Sauer advised Wright that he could source improved piano sounds for the piece, and requested permission to change them. Wright agreed, but did not hear the end result before the game went to the final master, and consequently some notes within the piece were transposed; this 'mistake' was also covered by Dimmu Borgir.

Legacy 
Around 2010, graphic artist Franck Sauer started to offer the game's binary files (ADF format) for free download on his personal webpage, making the game Freeware.
On July 4, 2020, the programmer of the game, Yves Grolet, uploaded all his Amiga development files (which included full source code for Agony) to WeTransfer.

References

External links
 Agony page from the game's artist Franck Sauer
 Agony at Amiga Hall of Light
 Agony at Psygnosis.org

1992 video games
Amiga games
Amiga-only games
Freeware games
Commercial video games with freely available source code
Psygnosis games
Horizontally scrolling shooters
Video games about birds
Video games scored by Jeroen Tel
Video games scored by Matthew Simmonds
Video games scored by Tim Wright (Welsh musician)
Video games developed in Belgium
Fantasy video games
Single-player video games